Presence: Teleoperators and Virtual Environments is a peer-reviewed academic journal dedicated to electromechanical and computer systems.  It was the first journal established specifically for investigators of teleoperators and virtual environments.  Presence was founded in 1992 and is published online and in hard copy by the MIT Press. According to the Journal Citation Reports, the journal has a 2016 impact factor of 0.750.

References

External links 
Official website

Computer science journals
MIT Press academic journals
Bimonthly journals
Publications established in 1992
English-language journals